Brasiliorchis picta is a species of plant in the orchid family native to Brazil, Paraguay and Argentina.

References

External links 

picta
Flora of Argentina
Flora of Brazil
Flora of Paraguay
Orchids of South America
Plants described in 1832